This is an incomplete list of LCD matrices.
TN+Film Matrices
IPS Matrices
S-IPS Matrices
E-IPS — Enhanced IPS (LG-specific terminology)
H-IPS – Horizontal IPS (LG-specific terminology)
P-IPS – Professional IPS (LG-specific terminology)
DD-IPS Matrices
ACE Matrices
MVA Matrices
PVA Matrices

References
X-bit labs LCD Guide
TFT Central Panel Technologies Guide

Liquid crystal displays
Technology-related lists